Domagojević dynasty was a native Croatian dynasty that ruled in Croatia, probably from 864 until 892, with interruptions. After the Trpimirović dynasty, they are the most well known Croatian dynasty in the Early Middle Ages.

The dynasty was named after Domagoj, the first member of dynasty known by name. The most famous of the Domagojević dynasty members are: Domagoj (founder) and Branimir.

The relation between Domagoj and Branimir is controversial. Some historians think that Branimir was a son of Domagoj, some think they were in some other family relation. Others think that there were no family relations between them.

Dukes of Croatia
Domagoj (864–876)
Unnamed son of Domagoj (876–878)
Branimir (879–892)

See also
 List of rulers of Croatia
Duchy of Croatia

Reflist

External links
Members of the Domagojević family among the Croatian statesmen (in English)
House of Domagojević in the chronology and history of Croatia (in Italian)
Prof. Rudolf Horvat: The History of Croatia (in Croatian)

Croatian dynasties
Lists of monarchs
Medieval Croatian nobility
9th-century Croatian people
People from the Duchy of Croatia